Pseudosubria is an Asian genus of bush crickets in the tribe Agraeciini, belonging to the 'conehead' subfamily Conocephalinae.  Species records are from Indo-China and Malesia.

Species
The Orthoptera Species File lists:
Pseudosubria bispinosa Ingrisch, 1998
Pseudosubria decipiens Karny, 1926 - type species
Pseudosubria falcata Ingrisch, 1998
Pseudosubria hastata Ingrisch & Shishodia, 1997
Pseudosubria transversa Ingrisch, 1998
Pseudosubria triangula Ingrisch, 1998

References

External links 
 
 Images of P. decipiens on OSF

Conocephalinae
Tettigoniidae genera
Orthoptera of Asia
Orthoptera of Indo-China